{{Infobox television
| native_name          = 
| genre                = Reality competition
| presenter            = Kang Daniel
| open_theme           = , 
| end_theme            = 
| country              = South Korea
| language             = Korean
| company              = 
| network              = Mnet
| first_aired          = 
| last_aired           = 
| related              = {{Plainlist|*Street Woman Fighter
Be Mbitious
Be the SMF
Street Dance Girls Fighter}}
}}Street Man Fighter, often abbreviated SMF, is the second season of the South Korean dance competition franchise Street Woman Fighter. It premiered on Mnet on August 23, 2022, and aired every Tuesday at 22:20 KST. It revolved around eight male dance crews fighting for the position of Korea's best male dance crew to represent street dance in the country (loosely marketed under the term "K-dance"). The winning crew (JustJerk) received  million, electric sedans from BMW, a sponsorship deal with KB Kookmin Bank, and the Street Man Fighter Trophy.

Cast
The program is presented by Kang Daniel.

The dance judges of this season are:
BoA
Eunhyuk (Super Junior)
Wooyoung (2PM)

Special Guests
"Class" mission (episode 2)
Zico
Gray
Giriboy
GroovyRoom
Czaer

"Mega Crew" mission (episode 6–7)
Sehun (EXO)
Harry June (DKB)
Kinjaz (video appearance)
Mike Song (Kinjaz) (special judge)

"Rain Choreography" mission (episode 7)
Rain
Kim Kyu-sang

Finale (episode 10)
Lee Sun-bin
Mike Song (Kinjaz) (special judge)
Kwon Eun-bi
Choi Ye-na
Yuju
Yoo Taeyang (SF9)
Los Bravú (Dea Gómez & Diego Omil)
Mathías Sánchez
Fatíma De Juan
Katherine Bernhardt

Street Man Fighter: Gala Talkshow (special episodes)
Haha
Jang Do-yeon
Kang Seung-yoon (Winner)

Contestants
Color key:
  Leader
  Sub-Leader

Missions
Mission 1: "Battle of the Underdog"
Each dancer beforehand pointed out a dancer from an opposing team that they can beat in a one-on-one dance battle. The chosen dancer is given a "No Respect" Sticker for each time they are chosen.

 The named dancer points out a dancer they consider to be the weakest, and engages in a one-on-one dance battle for 40 seconds each.
 The named dancer goes first while the pointed out dancer goes second.
 At the end of the battle, the Fight Judges will determine the winner.
 Fight Judges can request a rematch when no winner can be decided. A rematch will take place if two or more judges cannot decide a winner or in the case of a 1:1 tie and the third judge cannot choose a winner. In the rematch, both dancers dance at the same time for 40 seconds.
 The winning dancer gives a NO RESPECT sticker of their respective crew color to the losing team, which is stuck on their crew fist.
 The team with the most losses are labeled as the NO RESPECT Crew.

Round two consists of two-on-two battles. Round three consists of five-on-five crew battles. The rules for these rounds are the same as the one-on-one dance battles except if a rematch is called, it will only be a one-on-one battles with one member from each duo or crew.

Mission 2: "Class"

Each crew leader chooses seven members including themselves to be split into five ranks. Each rank will work together to create a dance video. Each rank will only have one main dancer which will be chosen by the judges. The rest will be back-up dancers in the video. Each dancer in a rank will create a short choreography which will be voted on by the members of their rank. The chosen choreography will be the one used to determine the main dancer.

In charge of the center position, choreography, and directing the video for their rank.
Receive 100 points for their crew.
Can designate the two "worst dancers" in their rank to battle for the final "worst" dancer, who will get 50 points deducted from their crew.

The two worst dancers chosen by the main dancer will have a dance battle. At the end of the battle, all the dancers of the crews except for those of the battlers will vote for the worst dancer using a "Worst" token. The dancer with more "Worst" tokens is the worst dancer.

Color key:

Color key:
  Winner

Vata from WeDemBoyz was chosen as best director by the Fight Judges and paired up the crews for the next mission.

Mission 3: "Global K-Dance"
Two crews compete using the same song from boy groups that "impressed the world with their performances", BTS, Big Bang, EXO, and Seventeen. Each crew must also complete the Choreography Copy Challenge. This round also included a bonus backup penalty part where the winner from the Choreography Copy Challenge could make the opposing crew into their backup dancers.

 There are two copy challenge sections in each song
 Of the two sections, each crew must take one section and create the choreography that the other team must "copy" and incorporate into their choreography
 If both crews want the same sections, they must discuss it among themselves
 Winning Crew chosen by the Fight Judges will also make a choreography where the opposing crew will be backup dancers.

The crew with the higher score for each battle wins and avoids elimination while the losing crew is nominated for elimination. Final scores are calculated as the sum of the Fight Judges' Score + Global Popular Vote Score + Main Dancer Score + Worst Dancer Score from the previous mission.

Fight Judges' score: Total of 600 points split between both crews
Global Popular Vote score: Voting period from July 8  to July 13, 2022, at 6:00 PM KST. Score calculated as Views + Likes X 100. 

Color key:
  Winner

As the losing crews — YGX, WeDemBoyz, Prime Kingz, and BankTwoBrothers were chosen as candidates for elimination. BankTwoBrothers was automatically placed in the elimination battle as a result of receiving the lowest score, and YGX was excluded from selection as a result of receiving the highest score out of the 4 losing crews. Later Prime Kingz was announced as the crew to battle BankTwoBrothers in the first elimination round. WeDemBoyz was saved from elimination.

 Best of 5: 
 Round 1 – Ace
 Round 2 – 2v2
 Round 3 – Leader
 Round 4 – Crew
 Round 5 – Rookie
 At the end of each round, the fight judges determine the winner
 The first crew to win three rounds is safe from elimination, while the losing crew is eliminated.

Mission 4: "Mega Crew"
Crews will compete in a Mega Crew mission where each crew will create their own choreography and perform it with a minimum of 30 performers including themselves. Crews must personally recruit their mega crew performers. Each crew must choose a costume to determine their concept to perform (no duplication) and will have 3 directors.

Final scores are calculated as the sum of the Fight Judges' Score + Global Popular Vote Score.

 Fight Judges' Score: Each judge awards up to 100 points to each three directors of each crew totaling up to 1200 points.
 Global Popular Vote Score: Voting period from September 20, 2022, at 12:30 AM KST to September 25, 2022, at 6:00 PM KST. Score calculated as Views + Likes X 100. Crews are ranked from this score and awarded points starting at 1200 points for the highest score.

 Best of 5: 
 Round 1 – 3 on 3 Battle
 Round 2 – Leader
 Round 3 – Hidden Battle
 Round 4 – Aces Battle
 Round 5 – Crew Battle
 At the end of each round, the fight judges determine the winner
 The first crew to win three rounds is safe from elimination, while the losing crew is eliminated.

Mission 5: "Rain's New Dance Song Choreography"
Each crew will create new choreography for Rain's new single "Domestic". The crew whose choreography is chosen by Rain have the benefit to direct the music video and the crew whose choreography video receives the most likes will receive 100 extra points each.

Mission 6: "Muse of Street Man Fighter"
Each crew will be joined by female dancers and must create and perform original choreography.

Final scores are calculated as the sum of the Fight Judges' Score  + Global Popular Vote Score + Experts' Jury Score + Rain's New Dance Song Choreography Score.

 Fight Judges' Score: Each judge awards up to 100 points to each crew totaling up to 300 points.
 Global Popular Vote Score: Voting period from October 19, 2022, at 12:00 AM KST to 15:53 PM KST. Score calculated as Views + Likes X 100. Crews are ranked from this score and awarded points starting at 1000'' points for the highest score.
 Expert Juries' Score: Calculated as the average score of real-time on-site voting scores of 100 expert juries for each genre.

As the lowest scoring crew, Eo-Ddae was automatically eliminated. BankTwoBrothers and 1Million will have an elimination battle for the last spot in the finals as the 4th and 5th place crews.

 Best of 5: 
 Round 1 – Hidden Battle
 Round 2 – 1v1 (The crew whose water bottle would point at would have the benefit of picking their opponent)
 Round 3 – 1v1 (Winner of the previous round will have a chance to choose their own opponent)
 Round 4 – Crew Battle
 Round 5 – Leader
 At the end of each round, the fight judges determine the winner
 The first crew to win three rounds is safe from elimination, while the losing crew is eliminated.

Mission 7: "Cheers"
Each crew will create a performance that highlights their happy moments.

Mission 8: "Last Dance"
Each crew will create a performance that shows the color and identity representing them.

Final ranking

Original soundtrack

Part 1

Part 2

Part 3

Part 4

Viewership

Notes

References

External links
 

South Korean reality television series
Dance competition television shows
2022 South Korean television series debuts
Mnet (TV channel) original programming
2022 South Korean television series endings